Tatyana Veniaminovna Vedeneyeva (born 10 July 1953) is a widely known Soviet and Russian actress and an anchor for the Soviet children's program Good Night, Little Ones!

Biography
She was born in Stalingrad, on July 10, 1953.

In 1972, she moved to Moscow and enrolled into Russian Academy of Theatre Arts (locally, GITIS). While attending the academy, she debuted in several motion pictures such as Hello, I'm Your Aunt! (1975) among the few. Upon graduation, Vedeneyeva was invited to the Mayakovsky Theatre, but soon was fired for not having a residential permission (propiska). She became well known amongst the Soviet children of 70s and 80s for her leading role in children programs Good Night, Little Ones!, and Visiting a Fairy Land (V gostiakh u skazki) as "Aunt Tania". She was also a presenter on the BBC's televised Russian language course for beginners, Russian Language and People.

In 1986, in Japan, she hosted an educational and entertainment program for the study of the Russian language on the NHK Educational TV. Later Vedeneyeva led various other TV shows and concert events and was amongst the most popular in the Union. In 1993 was forced to resign.

She moved to France with her husband where she lived until 1999. In 2000, Vedeneyeva returned to TV.

Her last known appearance in Good Night little ones occurred in 2002 as she was replaced by Oxana Fedorova as host. She also guest appeared on American TV in 1988.

Selected filmography
 Much Ado About Nothing as Gero (1973)
 Sergeant of militsiya as Natasha (1974)
 How do you do, doctor (1974)
 Hello, I'm Your Aunt! as Ella Delei (1975)
 That we didn't cover (1975)
 Sibir (1976)
 Fantaziya (1976)

References

External links
 Profile at kino-teatr.ru
 Brief bio at afisha.ru
 Tatyana Vedeneyeva on Internet Movie Database

Russian film actresses
Soviet film actresses
1953 births
Actors from Volgograd
Living people
Russian television presenters
Soviet television presenters
20th-century Russian actresses
21st-century Russian actresses
Russian journalists
Russian women journalists
Soviet journalists
Russian Academy of Theatre Arts alumni
Russian women television presenters
Mass media people from Volgograd